Anthony Favre (born 1 February 1984) is a retired Swiss professional footballer. He last played for FC Le Mont.

References

External links
 

1984 births
Living people
People from Rolle
Swiss men's footballers
Association football goalkeepers
Servette FC players
FC Lausanne-Sport players
FC Wil players
FC Zürich players
FC Le Mont players
Swiss Super League players
Swiss Challenge League players
Sportspeople from the canton of Vaud